George Gregory Nelmark (May 9, 1917 – December 4, 2010), born George Nelimarkka, was an American professional basketball player. He played in the National Basketball League for the Toledo Jim White Chevrolets (1941–42) and Syracuse Nationals (1946–48) and averaged 5.3 points per game for his career.

Nelmark served with the US Marine Corps during World War II, participating in the Battle of Guadalcanal.  After the war, he attended UC Santa Barbara, and became a teacher at Antelope Valley High School, Lancaster, CA in 1951, retiring in 1990.

References 

1917 births
2010 deaths
Amateur Athletic Union men's basketball players
American men's basketball players
United States Marine Corps personnel of World War II
Basketball players from Michigan
Guards (basketball)
High school basketball coaches in the United States
People from Ironwood, Michigan
Sportspeople from Santa Barbara, California
Syracuse Nationals players
Toledo Jim White Chevrolets players
Truman Bulldogs men's basketball players
University of California, Santa Barbara alumni